Irje is a settlement on the southern slopes of Mount Boč in the Municipality of Rogaška Slatina in eastern Slovenia. The entire area of Rogaška Slatina belongs to the traditional Styria region and is now included in the Savinja Statistical Region.

References

External links
Irje on Geopedia

Populated places in the Municipality of Rogaška Slatina